TEN: The Evening News is a Philippine television news broadcasting show broadcast by TV5. it premiered on August 11, 2008, on the network's evening line up replacing Big News and Sentro. It was anchored by former Sentro anchor Martin Andanar, former Big News anchor Cherie Mercado, & TV5 chief reporter Jove Francisco.  Recently, former Big News anchor Amelyn Veloso and Atty. Mike Toledo and TV5 reporter Naomi Dayrit also has joined the regular cast. The show concluded on March 31, 2010. The program was broadcast weeknights at 11 pm Philippine Standard Time. It was replaced by Aksyon and Aksyon JournalisMO.

Background
TEN premiered on August 11, 2008, replacing Big News and Sentro during the network's re-launch as TV5, portraying itself as a more contemporary and laid-back program, parallel to the programming lineup of the network. TEN utilizes a format emphasizing on the 10 most important stories of the day, progressing in significance throughout. The show also uses both English and Filipino languages interchangeably.

The show ended on  March 31, 2010, TEN: The Evening News, and was replaced by Aksyon and Aksyon JournalisMO.

Anchors
Martin Andanar
Cherie Mercado
Jove Francisco

Substitute anchors
Amelyn Veloso
Atty. Mike Toledo
Joel Gorospe

Contributors
Lourd de Veyra (Radioactive Sago Project frontman)

References

See also
 List of programs aired by TV5 (Philippine TV network)
 TV5 News (now as News5)

TV5 (Philippine TV network) news shows
TV5 (Philippine TV network) original programming
2008 Philippine television series debuts
2010 Philippine television series endings
Filipino-language television shows